Coleophora auricella is a moth of the family Coleophoridae. It is found from Germany and Poland to Spain, Italy and Romania. It has also been recorded from southern Russia.

The larvae feed on Sideritis endressii, Stachys alopecuros, Stachys officinalis, Stachys recta, Teucrium chamaedrys and Teucrium scorodonia. The mouth angle is about 25°. Larvae can be found from autumn to June.

References

auricella
Moths described in 1794
Moths of Europe